South Bunbury is a beachside suburb in Bunbury, Western Australia. It is located in the local government area of the City of Bunbury. The area is also known as 'Mangles'.

The South Bunbury Football Club's home ground is located at Hands Oval in South Bunbury.

The Bunbury Dynamos Football Club play at Forest Park in South Bunbury.

The suburb contains three primary schools, South Bunbury Primary School, Adam Road Primary School, and St Mary's Catholic Primary School, a government high school, Newton Moore Senior High School, and an education support school, College Row School.

The Bunbury Wildlife Park (previously know as Big Swamp Wildlife Park) is located in the suburb. There are more than 50 species of mostly native Australian animals at the park including wombats, kangaroos, wallabies, quokkas, potoroos, dingoes, native parrots, lizards, pythons and tree frog.

References 

Suburbs of Bunbury, Western Australia